Shott may refer to:
John Shott
Hugh Ike Shott
Chott
Shott, Missouri

See also

St. Shott's
Schott (disambiguation)